The nueva ola (Spanish for "new wave") was a loosely affiliated group of musicians, mainly in Spanish-speaking South America, who played and introduced rock 'n roll and other American and European music of the 1950s and 1960s to their countries. The term "nueva ola" was coined in Argentina around the turn of the 1960s to denote the foreign rock and roll styles that were gaining popularity among the youth, along with their local exponents. From there, the concept spread to Chile, with exponents such as Buddy Richard, Los Carr Twins, Los Red Junior, Luis Dimas, José Alfredo Fuentes, Fresia Soto, Cecilia, Gloria Aguirre and Pat Henry. And in Peru, with exponents such as Kela Gates, Jimmy Santi, Los Doltons, Joe Danova, Los Silvertons, Los Belkings and Anita Martinez.

Nueva ola bands usually had their names in English and rather than producing their own material they recorded versions of songs that were already popular in the United States or Europe. More than an artistic movement the nueva ola was an economic and social phenomenon that marked the beginning of youth culture and pop music in South America.

Artists associated with the nueva ola reached their peak of popularity in the 1960s. Nueva ola music was contemporaneous with nueva canción, a style which, together with nueva ola, became the precursor to the rock en español scene that rose to prominence in the 1980s. During the '90s nueva ola music experienced a revival in Chile.

Argentina

In 1960, RCA Victor general manager Ricardo Mejía discovered through a market research that there were almost no popular music stars among the youth. As a result, the company began the selection of new singers, initiating the phenomenon of the nueva ola in Argentina. Led by Mejía, RCA executives partnered with future journalist Leo Vanes and musicians Ray Nolan and Jimmy Lerman to create the TV show El club del clan. Based on foreign music shows, each episode showed a group of friends that got together to perform various styles of music including rock 'n' roll (and the accompanying twist), bolero and cumbia. The personality of each interpreter was modeled taking into account the type of music they would sing.  The show aired on Canal 13 on Saturdays at 8:30 pm, and proved to be extremely successful for RCA. It turned its young cast—which included Palito Ortega, Billy Caffaro, Violeta Rivas, Lalo Fransen, Nicky Jones and Cachita Galán—into the first national teen idols. Journalist Miguel Grinberg described El club del clan in 2006 as "a kind of juvenile ebullition that, impelled by television, established a basic difference, that was young people who did not reproduce the music of their parents."

In 1964, after The Beatles' performances in the United States, Beatlemania also reached Argentina, generating the appearance of several bands that imitated their sound and fashion. The nueva ola was overshadowed by the popularity of British Invasion bands, while at the same time a feeling nonconformity grew among the youth, which saw the phenomenon as too carefree and compliant. Before the dissolution of the group and "as a farewell," an El club del clan film directed by Enrique Carreras was released on March 12, 1964.

References

Argentine music
Peruvian music
Latin American music
Rock music genres
Popular music